A portrait sculpture of British Prime Minister Winston Churchill by William M. McVey is installed outside the British Embassy in Washington, D.C., United States. It is constructed of cast bronze, in small percentage larger-than-life.

History
It was unveiled by United States Secretary of State Dean Rusk, on 9 April 1966.

A model is in the collection of the Smithsonian American Art Museum.

Symbolism
Leaning lightly on a walking stick, Churchill holds up his hallmark gesture of the "victory" sign, first widely seen on Victory in Europe Day, 1945.

The statue's plaque notes that one of Churchill's feet is on American soil and one on British Embassy grounds, symbolizing his dual British-American ancestry and his work towards the maintenance of the Anglo-American alliance.

References

External links

Virtual Globe Trotting
CHURCHILL, Winston: Statue at the British Embassy in Washington, D.C., DC Memorials
Waymarking

1966 establishments in Washington, D.C.
1966 sculptures
Bronze sculptures in Washington, D.C.
Embassy Row
Monuments and memorials in Washington, D.C.
Outdoor sculptures in Washington, D.C.
Sculptures of men in Washington, D.C.
Statues in Washington, D.C.
Washington, D.C.